Raffaele Baldassarre (23 September 1956 – 10 November 2018) was an Italian politician and a member of the European Parliament from 2009 to 2014 for the European People's Party. He was born in Lecce and died in a hospital there after a sudden illness had its onset at his home the night prior.

Controversies
In 2013, Baldassarre was videotaped by Dutch newsblog Geenstijl, checking in at the European Parliament to claim 304 euro daily expenses fee and immediately leaving. When confronted, Baldassare attacked the reporter.

References

External links

MEPs for Italy 2009–2014
21st-century Italian politicians
People from Lecce
2018 deaths
European People's Party MEPs
1956 births